The Săsăuș is a right tributary of the Pârâul Nou in Romania. It flows into the Pârâul Nou between the villages Săsăuș and Nou Român.

References

Rivers of Romania
Rivers of Sibiu County